General Penal Code governs the criminal law in Iceland. The code is passed under Act no.19 and revised acts have been adopted in principal areas of law, such as the Act on Customs and the Act in Respect of Children. In the last few years, legislation is updated in certain fields of law, such as in banking, communications, corporations and intellectual property rights.

Structure 
General Penal Code of 1940, sub-divided into 29 chapters, comprises 269 articles.

References 

Law of Iceland